Sir John Baker  (1828 – 9 November 1909) was a Liberal Party politician in the United Kingdom.

He was elected at the 1892 general election as one of the two Members of Parliament (MPs) for Portsmouth, and held the seat until his defeat at the 1900 general election, when both Portsmouth seats were won by the Conservative Party.

He was re-elected at the 1906 general election, but died in office in 1909, aged 81. No by-election was held for his seat before Parliament was dissolved for the January 1910 general election.

References

External links 
 

1828 births
1909 deaths
Liberal Party (UK) MPs for English constituencies
UK MPs 1906–1910
UK MPs 1892–1895
UK MPs 1895–1900
Knights Bachelor
English justices of the peace